Boys in a Dory is a mid 19th-century painting by American artist Winslow Homer. Done in watercolor and gouache on wove paper, the painting depicts a group of boys boating in a dory. Winslow's work is in the collection of the Metropolitan Museum of Art.

Description 
Boys in a Dory is one of Homer's first watercolors. According to the Met's description of the painting, the artist's initial style of watercolors resulted in Boys being simple and direct. 

The painting was rendered by Homer while he was in Gloucester, Massachusetts.

References 

1873 paintings
Paintings in the collection of the Metropolitan Museum of Art
Paintings by Winslow Homer